Ali Benhalima (born 21 January 1962) is an Algerian retired football player.

Titles

National

 Algerian Cup : Runner-up 1981,1983 ,with ASC Oran
Algerian Championnat National: Runner-up 1990, with MC Oran
African Cup of Champions Clubs: Runner-up 1989, with MC Oran
Liga Adelante: 1993, with UE Lleida

International

 Africa Cup of Nations: Third 1988
1990 African Cup of Nations
1991 Afro-Asian Cup of Nations

References

External links
Ali Benhalima file - footballdatabase.eu

1962 births
Living people
Algerian footballers
Algeria international footballers
1988 African Cup of Nations players
1990 African Cup of Nations players
1992 African Cup of Nations players
ASM Oran players
MC Oran players
UE Lleida players
Segunda División players
Expatriate footballers in Spain
Footballers from Oran
Algerian expatriate sportspeople in Spain
Africa Cup of Nations-winning players
Association football defenders
21st-century Algerian people